Hangang Park or officially Hangang Citizen’s Park (Korean: 한강시민공원) is a park in Seoul, South Korea. It is made up of 12 parks, which is Gwangnaru Park, Jamsil Park, Ttukseom Park, Jamwon Park, Ichon Park, Banpo Park, Mangwon Park, Yeouido Park, Nanji  Park, Gangseo Park, Yanghwa Park, and Seonyudo Park.

Hangang Park was built from 1982 to 1986, with the government's launch of the Hangang River Development Project. The main goal of the project was to create an environmently friendly space that the citizens of Seoul, Koreans, foreigners and tourists can enjoy. While building the Hangang Park, a section of Hangang, 41.5 km long and 39.9 km2 large, turned into a river of 2.5m of average depth and 1 km of average width.

In 2007, the Hangang Renaissance Project was launched with the same goal, and will terminate in 2030. The project will transform the Hangang Parks and the areas around Hangang
into a place of culture, art, leisure, and riverside cities. The main theme is creation and restoration, and each of the park area is designated a special theme that will be used as a basis to develop the park and surrounding area.

In Hangang Park, there is an abundance of sporting facilities such as soccer fields, skateboarding and in-line skating parks, tennis courts, hiking/biking trails, etc. There are also many swimming pools and many water-related sports such as water-skiing, yachting, boat racing, and fishing are available in the Hangang Park.

The parks

Yeouido Park (Korean:여의도 한강공원)
Yeouido Park is located in Yeouido. It has an area of 1,487,374m2 and a length of 8.4 km. It is accessible by public transportation such as subway and buses. It also has various events such as the Hangang Spring Flower Festival, the Seoul International Fireworks Festival, various performances, and marathon events.

It was closed on April 1, 2020, because of the spread of COVID-19. Restriction was lifted on October 14, 2020, in the first phase of social distancing. On June 24, 2020, five people  infected with COVID-19 were revealed to have used a convenience store at Yeouido Hangang Park.

The address is 68 Yeouigongwon-ro, Yeongdeungpo-gu, Seoul, South Korea.

Banpo Park (Korean:반포 한강공원)
Banpo Park is located between Hannam Bridge, Dongjak Bridge and Banpo Bridge. It is 7.2 km in length, and the area of the park is 567,600m2.
It was part and the first result of the Han River Renaissance Project, one of the major policies of Oh Se-hoon, the mayor of Seoul.
The address is 40 Sinbanpo-ro 11-gil, Seocho-gu, Seoul, South Korea

Nanji Park (Korean:난지 한강공원)
Nanji Park is located Sangam-dong in Mapo District, between Nanjicheon Bridge and Hongjecheon Bridge. It has a length of 4.02 km and an area of
776,000m2. The Nanji Park, it is one of five World Cup parks to commemorate the 2002 FIFA World Cup. It was built with the abolition of Najido Garbage centre which was a landfill site along the Han River. Later on, it was reconstructed as part of the Hangang Renaissance project, including an amusement park, a central connection bridge to the sky park, and a complex connection passage.

The Mirror Fountain, located in the front of the bridge connecting Peace Park, is a landmark element of the Nanji Park. In the summer, the riverside waterpark is equipped with a swimming pool with a maximum water depth of 80 centimeters.

Nanji Park is also famous as holding 'Nanji Hangang Park Festival'. It holds many music festivals.

The address is 162 Hangangnanji-ro, Mapo-gu, Seoul, South Korea.

Tourist attractions

Sebitseom
Sebitseom (Korean:세빛섬) is an artificial island created by Seoul Metropolitan Government as a profitable private investment project in 2006 at the suggestion of Seoul citizen Kim Pun-sun, and it is located in Banpo Hangang Park. It is a complex cultural space located in the center of Seoul. Thus, it was designed to create a landmark where you can experience different waterfront culture and views of the Han River.
 It has 3 islands: Some Gavit, Chavit, and Solvit. It is used for various purposes such as screening, art exhibition, filming, and performances.

Banpo Bridge
Banpo Bridge (Korean:반포대교) is a 6-lane bridge with a length of 1,490m and a width of 25m, connecting Seobinggo-dong in Yongsan District and Banpo-dong in Seocho District. 
Banpo Bridge is a riverbed facility on the Han River, and it was built as one of the measures to promote urban development in the Gangnam district promoted by the Soul Metropolitan Government. By directly connecting Gyeongbu Expressway traffic to the city center, it plays a major role in improving the efficiency of the entire metropolitan area and educing the saturated traffic of Hannam Bridge. Overall, it is a two-story bridge, and on the second layer, it has the Moonlight Rainbow Fountain, created by the Hangang Renaissance Project.

Saetgang
Saetgang (Korean:샛강) is the river between Yeouido and the mainland. In Saetgang, there is Saetgang Bridge, which looks like a crane.

63 Building
63 Building (Korean:(63(육삼) 빌딩) is one of the tallest building with the ground height of 249 meters (264 meters above sea level) in Yeouido-dong, Yeongdeungpo-gu, Seoul, which was built in 1985. It was designed by US design companies Skidmore and Owings & Merrill, and was built by Shin Dong-A Group.the official name has been changed to 63 Square via Hanwha 63 City but it is more known as the 63 building. 
It is famously known for a sky lounge on the top of the building.

Cafe of light
The Cafe of light is located close to Yeouinaru Station with a panoramic view of the Hangang Park.  Drinks are available for purchase.

Leisure sports
In Hangang Park, there are many kinds of leisure sports which people can do. This includes bicycling, water skiing and tennis the whole year.

Swimming Pools
There are seven swimming pools in Hangang Park. Nanji, Mangwon, Yeouido, Jamwon, Jamsil, Ttukseom and Gwangnaru pools usually opens during the third week of June to the first week of July. It is open from 9:00 to 19:00 and can avoid heat on the closest swimming pool in Seoul. There are adult pools, waterfalls and kid pools for children with very low water depths, and LED fountains can be found in several swimming pools. There is an aqua ring and a water slide, and tourists can enjoy the summer vacation as if they are in huge water parks.

Bicycle roads
There are bicycle roads where people can enjoy cycling in Seoul. They are made of asphalt and concrete, so visitors can safely ride along the riverside without a traffic accident. There is a bicycle rental shop for tourists so that they do not have to carry their bike. Also there are bicycle repair shops in many places so that they could ride their bike comfortably. In addition to the usual bicycles, it is possible to ride a rail bike or other bicycles, or visitors can try the racing course or MTB course.

Winter Leisure
In Hangang Park, snow sleds are opened in Yeouido. It is open every day of the week and throughout the year. It is open from 9:00 to 17:00, and does not open from 12:00 to 1:00 to spread the snows again. In addition, in 2015, mini-bikes, bumper cars and electric bicycles were newly constructed to meet the needs of children. Also, there are many other activities such as smelt catching and bungee jumping.

Other Activities
There are aquatic resources in the Han River, so fishing is possible except for the prohibited areas. Anyone can do fishing without complying with the prohibition-related laws. Many water sports can be undertaken on the Han River including water skiing, motorboats, yachts and pleasure boats, and can be undertaken in most of the Han River parks.

Programs and Festivals

Hangang Spring Flower Festival
The Hangang Spring Flower Festival (한강봄꽃축제, also referred to as Yeouido Spring Flower Festival (Korean:여의도봄꽃축제)) is held in 'Yeoui West Street'(Korean:여의서로)in Yeongdeungpo District, Seoul, usually in early April, when cherry blossoms are in full bloom. The cherry blossoms, which lie on both sides of the Yunjuro Road for about 6 km, is especially impressing, and people say it is quite a sight to behold. Other flowers such as spireas, azaleas, and forsythias are in bloom, too.

Special events are prepared in the Hangang Spring Flower Festival. Events such as singing contests, parades of cute characters, flower coaches, 'Walking the spring flower way of love' make spring pinickers' hearts flutter.

For more information, see the menu Seoul _ Seoul Spring Flower Festival in List of modern Korean festivals

Seoul International Fireworks Festival
Seoul International Fireworks Festival (서울세계불꽃축제) is an event which shows fireworks in Seoul by Hanwha company. Different countries participate in this event every year.

Hangang Summer Festival

The Hangang Summer Festival (한강몽땅여름축제) is held annually in summer. It is a platform-type city festival which presents the attraction the world's biggest downtown river and the park beside it makes. The Korean word ‘한강몽땅’ means that everyone will become happy because of Hangang, and every cultural activity would be planned and would be enjoyed by every citizen. Culture related to Hangang such as water sports, circus, ecological experience are prepared for everyone.

In 2017, about 80 programs were held in the Hangang Summer Festival. The Festival was held with the topic ‘Uses for Hangang : Found Again!‘ for 31 days, and the slogan was ’Hangang is Summering’. As the slogan tells us, the purpose of this festival is to present a cool summer resort for many people who want to enjoy special programs for the summer. In the highlight period, the ‘Culture Cruise Ship Ara’(Korean : 문화유람선아라) made a differentiated room of festival.

The topics of the previous Hangang Summer Festivals are as follows.

 Hangang Summer Festival 2013
 Hangang Summer Festival 2014 - Enjoying the variegated taste of Hangang in midsummer
 Hangang Summer Festival 2015 - Hangang : Midsummer night's dream
 Hangang Summer Festival 2016 - Hangang coming with Amusements and Art
 Hangang Summer Festival 2017 - Uses for Hangang : Found Again!

Efforts to preserve Hangang Park
For the purpose of preserving Hangang Park, Seoul City managed the Ecological Landscape Conservation Area, Ecological Park, and Fish Road.
These are also part of the Hangang Renaissance Project.

Ecological Landscape Conservation Area
In Hangang Park, Godeok-dong, Bamseom, and Amsa-dong are designated as Ecological Landscape Conservation Areas.

Godeok-dong

Bamseom
In 1960, Bamseom was destroyed for purposes of development.
As the ecosystem was restored by ecological restoration, it became a habitat of many animals and plants.

Amsa-dong
Amsa-dong is a natural formation of reefs, large reed, grassland, and canyons that are formed by sediment from the upper stream of the Han River.
It is a habitat for a variety of animals and plants, especially many birds.

Ecological Park
In Hangang Park, the Yeouido creek, Gangseo wetland, Godeok riverside, Nanji wetland, and the Amsa waterfront are designated as Ecological Parks.

Yeouido creek
The Yeouido creek (Korean:여의도샛강) was the first ecological park in Korea, built on September 15, 1997. There is a waterfall and a pound using ground water generated in the nearby subway. In the surrounding area, wetland plants, weevils, buttercups, and water buffalo were planted in order to improve water quality and to adapt to the natural environment.

Gangseo wetland
The Gangseo wetland (Korean:강서습지) is a wetland ecological park where fish, amphibians, water birds, plants, and tidal aquaculture can inhabit and be reproduced. It was established by planting plants such as wet plants, aquatic plants, and herbaceous plants in the wetland downstream of the Han River. Gangseo wetland provides citizens with opportunities to observe ecosystems and to learn about environment and nature.

Godeok riverside
The Godeok riverside (Korean:고덕수변) was made by planting trees and herbaceous plants on the idle land of the Gokdong district, the upper stream of the Han River. With nearby forest terrains, the Godeok riverside contributes to the increase of ecological diversity and the conservation of the ecosystem. It also provides the place for leisure and ecological experience.

Nanji wetland
The Nanji wetland (Korean:난지습지) was created by one of the operations of the Hangang Municipal Park Nanji Area Specialization Project. An ecological wetland of 57,600 square meters was created by efforts to inflow the water of Hangang where before, the wetland could not do its role except in the rainy seasons. Nanji wetland actively introduces citizen participation activity to restore the ecosystem of Hangang and to aim an environmental city, coexisting with nature. It also plays the role of a site for ecological learning.

Amsa waterfront(Korean:암사둔치)
The artificial shore and bicycle road of the Amsa-dong riverside was demolished, and an ecological park with wildflowers, walking trails, a community of reeds and mussels was created to expand the habitat of livings and to improve the view of the scene.

Fish road
To restore and balance the ecosystem, Fish roads were made on the Hangang Park. Fish roads became a major tourist attraction, carrying out both roles of education and tourism.

The existing fish road, north to the Jamsil underwater reservoir, caused ecological unbalance due to disconnection between the upstream and downstream ecosystem. In order to restore and balance the Aquatic ecosystem of Hangang, a new fish road was constructed south to the reservoir. According to investigation, a total of 3,675 animals of 33 species are using the new fish road. 31 of the 33 species are pisces, while the other 2 are crustacea. Also, 7 of the 33 species(Acheilognathus yamatsutae, Acheilognathus gracilis, Sarcocheilichthys variegatus wakiyae, Sarcocheilichthys nigripinnis morii, Squalidus gracilis majimae, Squalidus japonicus coreanus, Microphysogobio jeoni) are native only to Korea. Also, 3 migratory fish species(Smelt, Ayu, Gymnogobius urotaenia) are using the fish road. Especially, the smelts had eggs when discovered, which means that the fish road did an important part in the migratory species' movement for laying eggs.

Gallery

See also
 Han River
 Yeouido
 Yeouido Park

References

External links
 
 Explanations of each park of Hangang Park by Seoul Metropolitan Government 
 Hanwha Seoul International Fireworks Festival 2017
 Hangang Summer Festival(English)
 Hangang Summer Festival 2014
 Hangang Summer Festival 2015
 Hangang Summer Festival 2016
 Hangang Summer Festival 2017

Han River (Korea)
Parks in Seoul
Sports venues in Seoul
Tourist attractions in Seoul